Kradikhino is a rural locality (a settlement) in Yenangskoye Rural Settlement, Kichmengsko-Gorodetsky District, Vologda Oblast, Russia. The population was 212 as of 2002. There are 6 streets.

Geography 
Kradikhino is located 79 km southeast of Kichmengsky Gorodok (the district's administrative centre) by road.

References 

Rural localities in Kichmengsko-Gorodetsky District